Alalan-e Qadim (also Romanized as Ālālān-e Qadīm; also known as Ālālān, Ālālān-e Jadīd, Bāzār Ālālān, and Ellalan) is a village in Asalem Rural District, Asalem District, Talesh County, Gilan Province, Iran. At the 2006 census, its population was 235, in 62 families.

References 

Populated places in Talesh County